Lee Geum-min (or  ; born 7 April 1994) is a South Korean footballer who plays as a forward for Women's Super League club Brighton & Hove Albion and the South Korea national team. She has previously played for Seoul WFC, Gyeongju KHNP and Manchester City.

Club career

Seoul WFC
On 4 November 2014, Lee was drafted first overall by Seoul WFC. She finished the 2015 season with six goals and two assists in 18 appearances. The following season, she scored nine goals and registered four assists in 18 appearances. In her final season with Seoul, Lee scored eleven goals and had six assists in 21 appearances.

Gyeongju KHNP
In 2018, Lee joined Gyeongju KHNP. On 23 April 2018, she made her debut in a 0–0 draw with Incheon Hyundai Steel Red Angels. On 14 May 2018, she scored twice in a 3–0 away victory against Changnyeong WFC. In her final game for Gyeongju KHNP, Lee scored a hat-trick as her team won 3–0 away at Boeun Sangmu, having previously scored two goals in the previous match, her last at home, a 5–2 win over Suwon UDC.

Manchester City
On 7 August 2019, Manchester City announced they had signed Lee on a two-year contract. Lee made her WSL debut for Manchester City on 7 September 2019 coming on as a second-half substitute against Manchester United at the Etihad. The match broke the record attendance for a WSL match at 31,213. Lee made her UEFA Women's Champions League debut and first City start in a 7–1 away win at Swiss team FF Lugano 1976 on 12 September 2019. Lee scored her first goal for Manchester City on 12 October 2019, coming on as a late substitute at home to Birmingham City to seal a 3–0 victory for City.

Loan to Brighton & Hove Albion
On 24 July 2020 it was announced Lee had joined WSL team Brighton & Hove Albion on loan for the 2020–21 season with head coach Hope Powell describing the signing as "a real coup." Lee made her debut for Brighton in the season opener, a 2–0 home win against Birmingham on Sept 6 2020.

Lee made her FA Cup debut on September 27, 2020, starting in Brighton's Quarter-Final also against Birmingham City.

On 7 February 2021 Lee was part of the Brighton team that ended Chelsea's 33-match unbeaten run with a 2–1 victory for the Seagulls. Her first goal for Brighton, a header, came in the Away fixture at Reading on 2 May 2021. Her second, a spectacular long-range hit, coming just 35 seconds later when she intercepted the ball from Reading's kick-off. It was described as an immediate contender for WSL goal of the season. Lee then went on to score in Brighton's next fixture, an end-of-season game at home to Bristol.

Brighton & Hove Albion

Lee transferred permanently to Brighton from Manchester City in August 2021. She scored for Albion in their 2021–22 season opener against West Ham United on 5 September 2021. It was her fourth goal in her last three WSL games, including the final two matches of the previous season.

International career
Lee was a member of the under-16 team that won the 2009 AFC U-16 Women's Championship and was in the under-17 squad that claimed the FIFA U-17 Women's World Cup the following year. She made two appearances at the 2011 AFC U-19 Women's Championship, scoring two goals against Australia in a 4–2 win. In 2013, she helped South Korea win the 2013 AFC U-19 Women's Championship and qualify for the 2014 FIFA U-20 Women's World Cup. Lee was selected by South Korea for the 2015 Women's World Cup and the 2019 Women's World Cup.

Career statistics

Club

International 

Scores and results list South Korea's goal tally first, score column indicates score after each Lee goal.

Honours

International
AFC U-16 Women's Championship: 2009
FIFA U-17 Women's World Cup: 2010
AFC U-19 Women's Championship: 2013

References

External links

Lee Geum-min at the Korea Football Association (KFA)
Lee Geum-min at the Korea Women's Football Federation (KWFF)

1994 births
Living people
South Korean women's footballers
South Korea women's under-17 international footballers
South Korea women's under-20 international footballers
South Korea women's international footballers
Women's association football forwards
WK League players
Women's Super League players
Manchester City W.F.C. players
Brighton & Hove Albion W.F.C. players
2015 FIFA Women's World Cup players
Footballers at the 2018 Asian Games
Asian Games bronze medalists for South Korea
Asian Games medalists in football
Medalists at the 2018 Asian Games
2019 FIFA Women's World Cup players
South Korean expatriate footballers
Expatriate women's footballers in England
South Korean expatriate sportspeople in England